Donnchadh mac Urchadh (died 959) was King of Maigh Seóla.

Nothing certain seems to be known of Donnchadh, though he would have been an uncle of Brian Boru. He is not listed in the genealogies.

References

 West or H-Iar Connaught Ruaidhrí Ó Flaithbheartaigh, 1684 (published 1846, ed. James Hardiman).
 Origin of the Surname O'Flaherty, Anthony Matthews, Dublin, 1968, p. 40.
 Irish Kings and High-Kings, Francis John Byrne (2001), Dublin: Four Courts Press, 
 Annals of Ulster at CELT: Corpus of Electronic Texts at University College Cork
 Byrne, Francis John (2001), Irish Kings and High-Kings, Dublin: Four Courts Press, 

People from County Galway
959 deaths
10th-century Irish monarchs
Year of birth unknown